The 2021 WNBA season was the 24th season for the Phoenix Mercury of the Women's National Basketball Association. The season tipped off on May 14, 2021, at the Minnesota Lynx.

The team returned to the newly renovated Phoenix Suns Arena this season.  Originally the team had planned to be elsewhere for the 2021 season, but renovations were finished ahead of schedule.

The start to the season was a mixed bag for the Mercury.  They went 3–3 during the first month of the season.  June was a streaky month for the team as they won the first two games, but then went on a four game losing streak.  The streak was broken by two wins, but followed by a loss to finish the month 4–5.  The Mercury lost the first game of July, won the middle two, and lost the last game before the Olympic break.  They went into the Olympic break with a 9–10 overall record.  The Mercury had a spectacular return from the Olympic break, winning all seven of their games in August.  Of the seven games only three were against playoff teams, and two of those three were against the eventual eight seed, New York Liberty.  The Mercury extended their winning streak into September, and won their first three games of the month.  However, their last three games of the season were against the eventual first, second, and fourth seeded playoff teams, and the Mercury lost all three games to finish the month 3–3.  They finished with an overall record of 19–13 and secured the fifth overall seed in the playoffs.

As the fifth seed in the playoffs, the Mercury did not receive a bye played in the First Round.  They defeated eight seed New York 83–82 in a close game.  As the higher remaining seed in the Second Round, they traveled to Seattle to face off against the fourth seeded Storm.  The Mercury advanced in a thrilling overtime game, 85–80.  As the highest seed to advance from the Second Round, the Mercury played the second seeded Las Vegas Aces in the Semifinals.  In a back and forth series the Mercury won games two, three, and five to win the series 3–2 and advance to the Finals.  In the Finals, the team faced the Chicago Sky.  The Mercury had home court advantage, meaning the first two games were played in Phoenix.  The Mercury split those games 1–1 and the series advanced to Chicago.  The Sky won both the games at home, and the series 3–1.

Transactions

WNBA Draft

Trades/Roster Changes

Roster

Game log

Preseason

|- style="background:#fcc;"
| 1
| May 8
| Seattle
| L 71–88
| Kia Nurse (12)
| Alanna Smith (8)
| NurseTaurasi (3)
| Phoenix Suns Arena1,985
| 0–1
|- style="background:#fcc;"
| 2
| May 10
| @ Seattle
| L 93–103
| Kia Nurse (26)
| Brittney Griner (6)
| Cierra Burdick (6)
| Angel of the Winds Arena
| 0–2

Regular season

|- style="background:#bbffbb;"
| 1
| May 14
| @ Minnesota
| W 77–75
| Skylar Diggins-Smith (18)
| Brittney Griner (12)
| TaurasiDiggins-Smith (5)
| Target Center2,021
| 1–0
|- style="background:#fcc;"
| 2
| May 16
| @ Connecticut
| L 78–86
| Diana Taurasi (19)
| Brianna Turner (8)
| Diana Taurasi (5)
| Mohegan Sun Arena2,042
| 1–1
|- style="background:#bbffbb;"
| 3
| May 18
| @ Washington
| W 91–70
| Diana Taurasi (17)
| Brianna Turner (14)
| Shey Peddy (6)
| Entertainment and Sports Arena1,050
| 2–1
|- style="background:#fcc;"
| 4
| May 21
| Connecticut
| L 67–84
| Skylar Diggins-Smith (20)
| GrinerTurner (5)
| Diana Taurasi (4)
| Phoenix Suns Arena4,101
| 2–2
|- style="background:#fcc;"
| 5
| May 26
| Las Vegas
| L 79–85
| Brittney Griner (27)
| Brittney Griner (11)
| Skylar Diggins-Smith (11)
| Phoenix Suns Arena4,082
| 2–3
|- style="background:#bbffbb;"
| 6
| May 29
| @ Dallas
| W 89–85
| Brittney Griner (27)
| Brittney Griner (16)
| Skylar Diggins-Smith (7)
| College Park Center1,717
| 3–3

|- style="background:#bbffbb;"
| 7
| June 1
| @ Chicago
| W 84–83
| Skylar Diggins-Smith (24)
| NurseTurner (8)
| Shey Peddy (6)
| Wintrust Arena1,217
| 4–3
|- style="background:#bbffbb;"
| 8
| June 3
| Chicago
| W 77–74
| Skylar Diggins-Smith (28)
| Brittney Griner (12)
| Brianna Turner (6)
| Phoenix Suns Arena3,819
| 5–3
|- style="background:#fcc;"
| 9
| June 9
| Dallas
| L 81–85
| Brittney Griner (27)
| Brittney Griner (16)
| Skylar Diggins-Smith (5)
| Phoenix Suns Arena3,618
| 5–4
|- style="background:#fcc;"
| 10
| June 11
| Dallas
| L 59–77
| Brittney Griner (19)
| Brittney Griner (6)
| Skylar Diggins-Smith (5)
| Phoenix Suns Arena4,261
| 5–5
|- style="background:#fcc;"
| 11
| June 13
| New York
| L 83–85
| Brittney Griner (29)
| Brittney Griner (14)
| Skylar Diggins-Smith (5)
| Phoenix Suns Arena4,476
| 5–6
|- style="background:#fcc;"
| 12
| June 16
| @ Los Angeles
| L 80–85
| Brittney Griner (30)
| Brianna Turner (12)
| Skylar Diggins-Smith (10)
| Los Angeles Convention Center514
| 5–7
|- style="background:#bbffbb;"
| 13
| June 18
| @ Los Angeles
| W 80–66
| Skylar Diggins-Smith (21)
| GrinerTurner (8)
| Diggins-SmithNurse (4)
| Los Angeles Convention Center520
| 6–7
|- style="background:#bbffbb;"
| 14
| June 27
| Los Angeles
| W 88–79
| Diana Taurasi (25)
| Brianna Turner (15)
| Skylar Diggins-Smith (4)
| Phoenix Suns Arena7,304
| 7–7
|- style="background:#fcc;"
| 15
| June 30
| Minnesota
| L 76–82
| Brittney Griner (28)
| Brittney Griner (7)
| Diana Taurasi (7)
| Phoenix Suns Arena4,122
| 7–8

|- style="background:#fcc;"
| 16
| July 3
| Minnesota
| L 68–99
| Skylar Diggins-Smith (12)
| Brianna Turner (6)
| Kia Vaughn (4)
| Phoenix Suns Arena8,182
| 7–9
|- style="background:#bbffbb;"
| 17
| July 7
| @ Las Vegas
| W 99–90 (OT)
| Brittney Griner (33)
| Brittney Griner (12)
| Skylar Diggins-Smith (8)
| Michelob Ultra Arena3,013
| 8–9
|- style="background:#bbffbb;"
| 18
| July 9
| Seattle
| W 85–77
| Brittney Griner (29)
| Brittney Griner (15)
| Skylar Diggins-Smith (6)
| Phoenix Suns Arena7,554
| 9–9
|- style="background:#fcc;"
| 19
| July 11
| @ Seattle
| L 75–82
| Kia Nurse (28)
| Brittney Griner (9)
| Shey Peddy (7)
| Angel of the Winds Arena5,110
| 9–10

|- style="background:#bbffbb;"
| 20
| August 15
| Atlanta
| W 92–81
| Skylar Diggins-Smith (19)
| Brianna Turner (17)
| Skylar Diggins-Smith (7)
| Footprint Center7,491
| 10–10
|- style="background:#bbffbb;"
| 21
| August 17
| Indiana
| W 84–80
| Brittney Griner (25)
| Brianna Turner (11)
| Diana Taurasi (7)
| Footprint Center4,089
| 11–10
|- style="background:#bbffbb;"
| 22
| August 19
| Washington
| W 77–64
| Brittney Griner (30)
| Brianna Turner (14)
| Brittney Griner (5)
| Footprint Center5,113
| 12–10
|- style="background:#bbffbb;"
| 23
| August 21
| @ Atlanta
| W 84–69
| Skylar Diggins-Smith (25)
| Brittney Griner (12)
| Skylar Diggins-Smith (7)
| Gateway Center Arena2,073
| 13–10
|- style="background:#bbffbb;"
| 24
| August 25
| @ New York
| W 106–79
| Skylar Diggins-Smith (27)
| Brianna Turner (15)
| Diana Taurasi (7)
| Barclays Center1,872
| 14–10
|- style="background:#bbffbb;"
| 25
| August 27
| @ New York
| W 80–64
| Skylar Diggins-Smith (27)
| Kia Vaughn (11)
| Skylar Diggins-Smith (7)
| Barclays Center2,315
| 15–10
|- style="background:#bbffbb;"
| 26
| August 31
| Chicago
| W 103–83
| Kia Nurse (21)
| Skylar Diggins-Smith (8)
| Skylar Diggins-Smith (10)
| Footprint Center5,838
| 16–10

|- style="background:#bbffbb;"
| 27
| September 4
| @ Indiana
| W 87–65
| Brittney Griner (22)
| Brianna Turner (11)
| Diana Taurasi (7)
| Indiana Farmers ColiseumN/A
| 17–10
|- style="background:#bbffbb;"
| 28
| September 6
| @ Indiana
| W 86–81
| Brittney Griner (21)
| Brittney Griner (10)
| Diana Taurasi (6)
| Indiana Farmers ColiseumN/A
| 18–10
|- style="background:#bbffbb;"
| 29
| September 8
| @ Atlanta
| W 76–75
| Shey Peddy (18)
| Brianna Turner (15)
| Skylar Diggins-Smith (5)
| Gateway Center Arena1,215
| 19–10
|- style="background:#fcc;"
| 30
| September 11
| Connecticut
| L 67–76
| Brittney Griner (25)
| Brittney Griner (12)
| Skylar Diggins-Smith (5)
| Footprint Center9,811
| 19–11
|- style="background:#fcc;"
| 31
| September 17
| @ Seattle
| L 85–94
| Brittney Griner (26)
| Brittney Griner (13)
| Brittney Griner (5)
| Angel of the Winds Arena6,000
| 19–12
|- style="background:#fcc;"
| 32
| September 19
| Las Vegas
| L 83–84
| Skylar Diggins-Smith (17)
| Brianna Turner (8)
| Skylar Diggins-Smith (7)
| Phoenix Suns Arena9,724
| 19–13

Playoffs 

|- style="background:#bbffbb;"
| 1
| September 23
| New York
| W 83–82
| Skylar Diggins-Smith (22)
| Brittney Griner (10)
| Brittney Griner (6)
| Grand Canyon University Arena5,827
| 1–0

|- style="background:#bbffbb;"
| 1
| September 26
| @ Seattle
| W 85–80 (OT)
| Brittney Griner (23)
| Brittney Griner (16)
| Skylar Diggins-Smith (6)
| Angel of the Winds Arena5,375
| 1–0

|- style="background:#fcc;"
| 1
| September 28
| @ Las Vegas
| L 90–96
| Brittney Griner (24)
| Brianna Turner (8)
| GrinerTaurasi (6)
| Michelob Ultra Arena7,009
| 0–1
|- style="background:#bbffbb;"
| 2
| September 30
| @ Las Vegas
| W 117–91
| Diana Taurasi (37)
| Brianna Turner (8)
| Diggins-SmithGrinerVaughn (5)
| Michelob Ultra Arena6,432
| 1–1
|- style="background:#bbffbb;"
| 3
| October 3
| Las Vegas
| W 87–60
| Brianna Turner (23)
| Brianna Turner (17)
| Skylar Diggins-Smith (9)
| Desert Financial Arena7,090
| 2–1
|- style="background:#fcc;"
| 4
| October 6
| Las Vegas
| L 76–93
| Diggins-SmithTaurasi (14)
| Brittney Griner (8)
| TaurasiTurner (4)
| Footprint Center11,255
| 2–2
|- style="background:#bbffbb;"
| 5
| October 8
| @ Las Vegas
| 87–84
| Brittney Griner (28)
| Brianna Turner (11)
| Skylar Diggins-Smith (8)
| Michelob Ultra Arena9,680
| 3–2

|- style="background:#fcc;"
| 1
| October 10
| Chicago
| L 77–91
| Brittney Griner (20)
| Brianna Turner (9)
| Skylar Diggins-Smith (4)
| Footprint Center10,191
| 0–1
|- style="background:#bbffbb;"
| 2
| October 13
| Chicago
| W 91–86 (OT)
| Brittney Griner (29)
| GrinerTurner (9)
| Skylar Diggins-Smith (12)
| Footprint Center13,685
| 1–1
|- style="background:#fcc;"
| 3
| October 15
| @ Chicago
| L 50–86
| Brittney Griner (16)
| Brianna Turner (7)
| Skylar Diggins-Smith (3)
| Wintrust Arena10,378
| 1–2
|- style="background:#fcc;"
| 4
| October 17
| @ Chicago
| L 74–80
| Brittney Griner (28)
| Brianna Turner (12)
| Skylar Diggins-Smith (8)
| Wintrust Arena10,378
| 1–3

Standings

Playoffs

Statistics

Source:

Regular season

Awards and Milestones

References

External links

Phoenix Mercury seasons
Phoenix Mercury
Phoenix Mercury